Zurich International School (ZIS) is an independent non-profit day school in Switzerland for students aged 3 to 18 in the greater Zurich area. Over 1,300 students from more than 50 countries are enrolled in the school. The school has two campuses: a Primary campus in Wädenswil for Early Childhood and Lower School students aged 3 to 11 and a Secondary Campus in Adliswil for Middle School students aged 11 to 14 and Upper School students aged 14 to 18.

 it is the largest international school in the Zurich area.

History

American International School of Zurich
The American International School of Zurich (AISZ) was founded in 1963 in a Swiss villa (built in 1914) in Kilchberg. The building was renovated and expanded in 1993/4.  In 2008 this became the ZIS Middle School for students aged 11 to 14.

International Primary School of Zurich
The English Language Kindergarten (ELK), later renamed the International Primary School of Zurich (IPSZ), opened in 1970 in Horgen and in 1979 moved to the current Early Childhood Center.  This villa, which was built in 1906 on the shore of Lake Zurich in Kilchberg, was attended by children aged three to four until June 2019.

Merger and post-merger
The Pre-School to Grade 12 Zurich International School was formed in 2001 through the merger of the American International School of Zurich and the International Primary School of Zurich.

The purpose-built Lower School opened in Wädenswil in 2002 and was attended by students aged four to 11 until June 2019. In July 2019 the Early Childhood Center was moved to the Lower School and now children from the age of three to 11 attend the campus.

In 2008 a new Upper School opened in Adliswil and is attended by students aged 14 to 18.

A fifth campus, ZIS Baden, opened in 2008 in the city center.  Initially this was for children aged three to 11, but in 2010 expanded to include a Middle School for students aged 11 to 14. This campus closed in July 2015 due to low enrollment.

In August 2022, a new Middle School, connected to the upper school in Adliswil opened to form the Secondary Campus.

Accreditation

By Swiss authorities
ZIS's Kindergarten and primary education programs (Lower School) are approved by the bureau for elementary school (Volksschulamt), administration for education (Bildungsdirektion), canton of Zurich.

In August 2021 ZIS launched a bilingual program which is based on the curriculum of the Canton of Zurich and approved by it. It is for students aged 3 - 8 and will grow over the coming years up to Grade 6.

ZIS's lower secondary education (Middle school) is approved as Sekundarstufe by the bureau for elementary school (Volksschulamt), administration for education (Bildungsdirektion), canton of Zurich.

However ZIS's upper secondary education (Upper School) is not approved as a Mittelschule, neither by the bureau for gymnasial and vocational education (Mittelschul- und Berufsbildungsamt), administration of education (Bildungsdirektion), canton of Zurich, nor by the Swiss Federal State Secretariat for Education, Research and Innovation (SERI).

By American and international authorities
ZIS is an International Baccalaureate (IB Organization World School) ZIS is accredited by both the Council of International Schools and the New England Association of Schools and Colleges The school offers both the International Baccalaureate Diploma and Advanced Placement courses.

Campuses and facilities

Lower School – Early Childhood to Grade 5 (children aged 3 to 11) 
The purpose-built Lower School opened in 2002. 454 students study on the campus which has both indoor and outdoor sports facilities as well as a large multi-purpose room. There are music practice rooms, an extensive library, and a lunch room.

Middle School – secondary school (children aged 11 to 14) 
267 students study in a 19th-century villa in Kilchberg. The villa was renovated in 1993/4 and includes science laboratories, a theatre, art room, music rooms, and dining area.  The grounds include a playing field and tennis courts. The Middle School moved to a new purpose-built building, next to the existing Upper School in Adliswil in August 2022, to form a combined Middle and Upper School Secondary Campus.

Upper School – high school for Grades 9 – 12 (children aged 14 to 18) 
The purpose-built Upper School opened in 2008 and 445 students are currently enrolled. A triple gym, outdoor sports field, music practice rooms, art studios, a theatre as well as a dining area are available for the students.  There is an IT/Mac room.

Language program
The main instruction language is English.  Students in Pre-Kindergarten to Grade 9 are required to learn German, unless they are in the English as an Additional Language (EAL) program.  Students can choose to learn French and Spanish from Grade 6 (age 11) onwards. Language teachers are native speakers.
A large number of students at ZIS arrive knowing little or no English.  The EAL program includes small group lessons to help them improve their language skills.  ZIS classroom teachers are experienced in working with non-English speaking students.

In August 2021 ZIS opened a bilingual pathway in the Lower School. It is for students aged 3 - 8 and will grow over the coming years up to Grade 6.

Mother Tongue – there are a number of mother tongue classes, supported by the school and held at ZIS premises, but held after school hours.  These include French, Dutch, Hebrew, Swedish and German.

Sports
All students from Pre-School to Grade 10 (aged three to 16) take physical education as part of their educational program. At the Early Childhood Center PE is combined with other activities.  ZIS uses its own facilities as well as local sporting centers.  From the Middle School onwards students have the opportunity to compete in a variety of sports, within school as well as against other international schools.   Students compete in the SGIS (Swiss Group of International Schools), SCIS (Sports Council of International Schools), and ISST (International Schools Sports Tournaments).  Sports include cross-country, volleyball (girls), soccer, and rugby (boys), in the fall; alpine skiing, basketball, and swimming in the winter, and tennis, track and field, softball (girls), and golf in the spring.

Arts
All students in Pre-School to Grade 6 have compulsory music lessons. Students in Grade 3 learn the recorder, while Grades 4 and 5 can learn another instrument.  In the Middle School there are choirs/band/orchestra. Students of all ages can take private music lessons on school premises with selected music teachers.  There are choirs at the Lower, Middle and Upper Schools.  There are regular concerts and recitals through the year for students of all ages. In the Middle and Upper Schools students can take drama as a class and also participate in the twice-yearly productions, such as ‘Grease’ and ‘Les Miserables’.  At the Upper School students can direct and perform plays and shows as part of their studies.  Art is part of the curriculum at the Early Childhood Center and Lower School, and an option for Middle and Upper School students. Notably, ZIS offers the opportunity for students to audition for the AMIS program, which hosts annual festivals for band, orchestra, jazz band and choir at different international schools.

References

External links 

 Swiss Group of International Schools
IB World Schools
 Council of International Schools
 Educational Collaborative for International Schools ecis.org
 New England Association of Schools and Colleges
 Zurich International School zis.ch

Upper secondary schools in the Canton of Zürich
International Baccalaureate schools in Switzerland
American international schools in Switzerland
Private schools in Switzerland
Educational institutions established in 1963
1963 establishments in Switzerland
Education in Zürich
International schools in Switzerland